Diego Andres Ayala Santa Cruz (born 9 January 1990) is a Paraguayan footballer who currently plays for Nybergsund.

He played for the Paraguay Under-20s in the South American Youth Championship Venezuela 2009.

Teams
 Libertad 2008–2010
 All Boys 2010–2012

External links
 
 

1990 births
Living people
Paraguayan footballers
Paraguayan expatriate footballers
Paraguay international footballers
Club Libertad footballers
All Boys footballers
Nybergsund IL players
Expatriate footballers in Argentina
Expatriate footballers in Norway
Sportspeople from Asunción
Association football fullbacks
Association football midfielders